Samy Moussa (born June 1, 1984) is a Canadian conductor and composer of classical music, living in Berlin. His works have been performed internationally.

Early life and education
Moussa was born and grew up in Montreal. He completed his undergraduate studies at the Université de Montréal with José Evangelista and postgraduate studies at University of Music and Performing Arts Munich with Matthias Pintscher and Pascal Dusapin, also participating in conducting master classes with Pierre Boulez, Péter Eötvös, and Royaumont Voix Nouvelles courses with Salvatore Sciarrino.

Career
In 2010, Moussa became music director of the INDEX Ensemble in Munich, and since that time worked with a number of ensembles and orchestras among which were: MDR Leipzig Radio Symphony Orchestra, hr-Sinfonieorchester, CBC Radio Orchestra, Vancouver Symphony Orchestra and Hamilton Philharmonic Orchestra among others.

He conducted the premiere of his second opera, Vastation, with a libretto by Toby Litt, at the Munich Biennale in 2014.

His first symphony, titled Concordia, was premiered by Kent Nagano conducting the Montreal Symphony Orchestra in May 2017. That year the Dallas Symphony Orchestra performed his work "A Globe Itself Infolding", which had previously been recorded by the Montreal Symphony.

In 2013, Moussa won the Ernst von Siemens Composers' Prize. In 2017, he received the Hindemith Prize. In 2018, the German government awarded him a fellowship at Villa Massimo in Rome.

References

External links

1984 births
Living people
Canadian male composers
21st-century classical composers
Canadian conductors (music)
Male conductors (music)
Université de Montréal alumni
Ernst von Siemens Composers' Prize winners
21st-century Canadian male musicians
Juno Award for Classical Composition of the Year winners